John Henry Collins (3 March 1880 – 12 January 1952) was a nationalist politician and solicitor in Northern Ireland.

Born in Newry, he was educated at the Christian Brothers School, Newry, and Queen's University Belfast.

At the 1925 general election, he was elected to the Parliament of Northern Ireland for County Armagh, and then from 1929 to 1933 for South Down. He did not take his seat until 2 November 1927. He did not contest the 1933 election.

References

1880 births
1952 deaths
Members of the House of Commons of Northern Ireland 1925–1929
Members of the House of Commons of Northern Ireland 1929–1933
Members of the House of Commons of Northern Ireland for County Armagh constituencies
Members of the House of Commons of Northern Ireland for County Down constituencies
Alumni of Queen's University Belfast